Chatterton is a small village in the southern part of the Rossendale Valley, Lancashire, England.

It is half a mile north of Ramsbottom town centre on the A676 between Bolton and Edenfield. For local government purposes, it receives services from Rossendale Borough Council and Lancashire County Council. Nearby are the village of Stubbins and the hamlet of Strongstry. Running alongside the village separating it from Strongstry is the River Irwell.

Much of the land to the west of the village is in the care of the National Trust and consists of hillside pasture and woodland leading up to Holcombe Moor and Peel Tower.

Parkland at Chatterton was given to the people of the district of Ramsbottom as a peace memorial by the Porritt family.

Etymology
Like Catterton in North Yorkshire and Chadderton near Oldham, the name Chatterton is formed from the Brittonic cadeir, meaning "chair, throne" (Welsh cadair, see Blencathra and Catterlen in Cumbria), suffixed with Old English –tūn, "farm".

Lancashire machine-breaking riots

On 26 April 1826, rioting Luddites were read the Riot Act at Chatterton by the 60th Rifle Corps (later to become known as the King's Royal Rifle Corps). Ignoring the reading of the act, the mob attempted to destroy looms at Aitken and Lord's factory whereupon the soldiers eventually opened fire, killing 4 men and wounding many others.

References

 Peacock, Doug "The 1826 machine-breaking riots". Retrieved 23 September 2009.

External links

Villages in Lancashire
Geography of the Borough of Rossendale